Aleksandr Skvortsov may refer to:
 Aleksandr Skvortsov (cosmonaut) (born 1966), Russian cosmonaut
 Aleksandr Skvortsov (ice hockey) (1954–2020), Soviet ice hockey player
 Aleksandr Skvortsov (footballer) (born 1982), Russian footballer